The Armstrong Siddeley Cougar was an aero engine developed by Armstrong Siddeley in 1945. The design was a departure from earlier Armstrong Siddeley engines in many ways, it was the company's only nine-cylinder radial design. Although the engine was tested it did not find an aircraft application and was not produced.

Specifications (Cougar)

See also

References

Further reading
 

1940s aircraft piston engines
Aircraft air-cooled radial piston engines
Cougar